Hannerl and Her Lovers is a 1921 German silent comedy film directed by Felix Basch. It was remade as a 1936 Austrian sound film of the same title.

Cast
Gretl Basch as Hannerl Thule
Felix Basch as Jan Robulja
Ernst Deutsch as Priester
Rosa Valetti as Wahrsagerin
Arnold Korff as Von den Busch
Karl Beckersachs
Irmgard Bern
Wilhelm Diegelmann
Ilka Grüning
Karl Platen
Hermann Thimig

See also
Love Me and the World Is Mine (1928)

References

External links

Films of the Weimar Republic
German silent feature films
Films directed by Felix Basch
1921 comedy films
German comedy films
UFA GmbH films
German black-and-white films
Silent comedy films
1920s German films